Christoph Weilhamer (1547–1597) was a Roman Catholic prelate who served as Auxiliary Bishop of Passau (1589–1597).

Biography
Christoph Weilhamer was born in Landshut, Germany in 1547 and ordained a priest in 1578. On 9 Oct 1589, he was appointed during the papacy of Pope Sixtus V as Auxiliary Bishop of Passau and Titular Bishop of Symbalia. He served as Auxiliary Bishop of Passau until his death on 22 May 1597.

References 

16th-century Roman Catholic bishops in Bavaria
Bishops appointed by Pope Sixtus V
1597 deaths
1547 births